Capital punishment in Thailand is a legal penalty, and the country is, as of 2021, one of 54 nations to retain capital punishment both in legislation and in practice. Of the 10 ASEAN nations, only Cambodia and the Philippines have outlawed it, though Laos and Brunei have not conducted executions for decades.

Thailand retains the death penalty, but carries it out only sporadically. Since 1935, Thailand has executed 326 people, 319 by shooting (the latest on 11 December 2002), and 7 by lethal injection (the latest on 18 June 2018). As of March 2018, 510 people are on death row. As of October 2019, 59 are women and 58 are for drug-related crimes. Bang Khwang Central Prison contains the nation's primary death row, but death rows are present for both men and women in provincial prisons.

Thai law permits the imposition of a death sentence for 35 crimes, including treason, murder, and drug trafficking.

History
During the Rattanakosin period, Thailand—then called Siam—was under the "Law of the Three Seals", also called Kotmai Tra Sam Duang. This system was codified in 1805 during the reign of King Rama I and remained in place until Thailand transitioned to a constitutional monarchy following a bloodless revolution in 1932. There were 21 different forms of capital punishment under the Law of the Three Seals, many of them cruel. For example, those convicted of treason would be wrapped in oil-soaked cloth and set ablaze. Execution methods have changed over the years. In 1938, for example, convicts were executed using a single shot rifle. In later years, the condemned were handcuffed to a cross and an executioner fired a machine gun at their back on command, as described in 1955 when three men were executed (for killing king Ananda Mahidol) "with their arms fixed to the cross bar and their hands clasped in a traditional wai. In their hands were placed incense sticks, flowers and candles. The executioner fired a barrage from a sub machine gun at each condemned man's heart".

One convict, a woman who had organised a kidnapping, was put on the cross twice as she survived the first volley. In 2001 five convicts were executed by firing squad in a public execution, provoking strong criticism from human rights groups.

On 19 October 2003, Thailand officially abolished shooting and adopted lethal injection as the sole means of execution.

According to a statement by the Corrections Department on 18 June 2018, there have been a total of 326 people legally executed under the modern Penal Code since its enactment in 1935, of whom 319 were executed by means of shooting, and seven by lethal injection.

The last execution by shooting was on 11 December 2002 and the first execution by lethal injection was on 12 December 2003.

The most recent execution occurred on 18 June 2018, when the death sentence of a 26-year-old man guilty of robbery resulting in death was carried out. This is the first execution in nine years and the man was the country's seventh person to be executed by means of lethal injection.

Public opinion
A 2014 Bangkok Post article said that Mahidol University lecturer Srisombat Chokprajakchat's survey indicated "more than 41% of Thais nationwide want to keep the death penalty on the books, but only 8% want to scrap capital punishment, with the majority undecided...most of those who favoured execution as a legal punishment felt it was the most effective deterrent against capital crimes, including murder and rape".

The Bangkok Post in 2018 asked whether the death penalty should continue to be enforced. A majority, 92.49%, agreed and 7.51% disagreed. Another survey indicated that 41% wanted to retain the death penalty as a sentencing option. Prime Minister Prayut Chan-o-cha in 2018 said that the death penalty is necessary to maintain peace and order and deter severe crimes.

See also 
Crime in Thailand
Law of Thailand
Execution of Thai royalty

References

 
Law enforcement in Thailand
Law of Thailand
Death in Thailand
Human rights in Thailand